Goin' Up in Smoke  is the eighth album by former Temptations vocalist Eddie Kendricks. It was released in September 1976 on the Tamla imprint of Motown Records.

Mariah Carey sampled the title track in 2014 on her song "Meteorite".

Reception

Track listing
"Goin' Up in Smoke" (Allan Felder)  4:30
"The Newness Is Gone" (Allan Felder)  4:40 
"Sweet Tenderoni" (Allan Felder)  4:15
"Born Again" (Allan Felder)  3:26 
"Don't You Want Light" (Brian Evans, Donald Harmon, John Faison)  3:47
"Music Man" (Jerry Akines, Johnny Bellmon, Reginald Turner, Victor Drayton)  4:43
"Thanks for the Memories" (Bruce Gray, Phil Hurtt)  4:56
"To You From Me" (Bruce Gray, Frank Snowden, Mike Holden, T.G. Conway)  3:00
"Don't Put Off Till Tomorrow" (Allan Felder, Norman Harris) 3:53 
"Skeleton in Your Closet" (Jerry Akines, Johnny Bellmon, Reginald Turner, Victor Drayton)  2:36

Personnel
Eddie Kendricks - lead and backing vocals
Norman Harris - guitar
Vincent Montana Jr. - vibraphone
Bruce Gray - keyboards, backing vocals
Michael "Sugar Bear" Foreman, Ron Baker - bass
Charles Collins, Earl "The Pearl" Young - drums
Bobby Eli, T.J. Tindall - guitar
Carlton Kent, Ron "Have Mercy" Kersey, T. G. Conway - keyboards
Larry Washington, Robert Cupit - congas
Allan Felder - percussion
Don Renaldo - horns, strings
Allan Felder, Barbara Ingram, Carl Helm, Carla Benson, Evette Benton, Phil Hurtt, Ronald T. Presson - backing vocals

Charts

Singles

References

External links
 Eddie Kendricks-Goin' Up In Smoke at Discogs.com

1976 albums
Eddie Kendricks albums
Albums produced by Norman Harris
Albums recorded at Sigma Sound Studios
Tamla Records albums